Eric Reed Boucher (born June 17, 1958), known professionally as Jello Biafra, is an American singer, spoken word artist and political activist. He is the former lead singer and songwriter for the San Francisco punk rock band Dead Kennedys.

Initially active from 1979 to 1986, Dead Kennedys were known for rapid-fire music topped with Biafra's sardonic lyrics and biting social commentary, delivered in his "unique quiver of a voice". When the band broke up in 1986, he took over the influential independent record label Alternative Tentacles, which he had founded in 1979 with Dead Kennedys bandmate East Bay Ray. In a 2000 lawsuit, upheld on appeal in 2003 by the California Supreme Court, Biafra was found liable for breach of contract, fraud, and malice in withholding a decade's worth of royalties from his former bandmates and ordered to pay over $200,000 in compensation and punitive damages; the band subsequently reformed without Biafra. Although now focused primarily on spoken word performances, Biafra has continued as a musician in numerous collaborations. He has also occasionally appeared in cameo roles in films.

Politically, Biafra is a member of the Green Party of the United States and supports various political causes. He ran for the party's presidential nomination in the 2000 presidential election, finishing a distant second to Ralph Nader. In 1979 he ran for mayor of San Francisco, California. He is a supporter of a free society and utilizes shock value and advocates direct action and pranksterism in the name of political causes. Biafra uses absurdist media tactics, in the leftist tradition of the Yippies, to highlight issues of civil rights and social justice.

Early life
Eric Reed Boucher was born in Boulder, Colorado, the son of Virginia (née Parker), a librarian, and Stanley Wayne Boucher, a psychiatric social worker and poet. His sister, Julie J. Boucher, was Associate Director of the Library Research Service at the Colorado State Library; she died in a mountain-climbing accident on October 12, 1996. He has a Jewish great-grandparent, but was unaware of this until he was in his mid-40s. Due to his secular upbringing and lack of knowledge of his distant Jewish ancestry until adulthood, he does not consider himself Jewish.

As a child, Boucher developed an interest in international politics that was encouraged by his parents. An avid news watcher, one of his earliest memories was of the John F. Kennedy assassination. Boucher became a fan of rock music after first hearing it in 1965 when his parents accidentally tuned in to a rock radio station. As a teenager, his high school guidance counselor advised him to spend his adolescence preparing to become a dental hygienist.

Musical career

Colorado bands
In 1977, he served as a roadie for a local band called The Ravers (who later changed their name to The Nails), helping set up their equipment at shows, including as an opener for the Ramones. The job ended shortly after the Ramones show, when The Ravers were offered a record contract and left Colorado. Boucher credits seeing Joey Ramone as inspiration to become a singer, and the Ramones lyrics for inspiring the use of humor in his own songs.

Shortly after graduating high school, he formed a band called The Healers, with John Greenway and an unknown third member. Boucher has described The Healers' music as "banging on instruments we didn't know how to play when our parents weren't home". While never playing a show, the band made recordings, including an early version of "California Über Alles", but did not want any of it to be released to the public. Some of their music was made available on a 2009 compilation of late 1970s Colorado punk bands titled Rocky Mountain Low, including the original version of "California Über Alles", which Maximum Rocknroll described as experimental improv in their review.

Boucher left Boulder to attend the University of California, Santa Cruz but dropped out after the first quarter of the school year.

Dead Kennedys

In June 1978, Boucher responded to an advertisement placed in a store by guitarist East Bay Ray, stating "guitarist wants to form punk band", and together they formed the Dead Kennedys. He began performing with the band under the stage name Occupant, but soon began to use the stage name Jello Biafra, a combination of the brand name Jell-O and the short-lived African state Biafra.

Biafra initially attempted to compose music on guitar, but his lack of experience on the instrument and his own admission of being "a fumbler with my hands" led Dead Kennedys bassist Klaus Flouride to suggest that Biafra simply sing the parts he envisioned to the band. Biafra sang his riffs and melodies into a tape recorder, which he brought to the band's rehearsal and/or recording sessions. This later became a problem when the other members of the Dead Kennedys sued Biafra over royalties and publishing rights. By all accounts, including his own, Biafra is not a conventionally skilled musician, though he and his collaborators (Joey Shithead of D.O.A. in particular) attest that he is a skilled composer and his work, particularly with the Dead Kennedys, is highly respected by punk-oriented critics and fans.

The first single by Dead Kennedys was their version of "California über alles". The song, which spoofed California governor Jerry Brown, was the first of many political songs by the group and Biafra. Its popularity resulted in being covered by other musicians, such as The Disposable Heroes of Hiphoprisy (who rewrote the lyrics to parody Pete Wilson), John Linnell of They Might Be Giants and Six Feet Under on their Graveyard Classics album of cover versions. Not long after, the Dead Kennedys had a second and bigger hit with "Holiday in Cambodia" from their debut album Fresh Fruit for Rotting Vegetables. AllMusic cites this song as "possibly the most successful single of the American hardcore scene" and Biafra counts it as his personal favorite Dead Kennedy's song. 

The Dead Kennedys received some controversy in the spring of 1981 over the single "Too Drunk to Fuck". The song became a hit in Britain, and the BBC feared that it would manage to be a big enough hit to appear among the top 30 songs on the national charts, requiring a mention on Top of the Pops. However, the single peaked at number 31 in the charts.

The EP In God We Trust, Inc. contained the song "Nazi Punks Fuck Off!" as well as "We've Got A Bigger Problem Now", a rewritten version of "California über alles" about Ronald Reagan. Punk musician and scholar Vic Bondi considers the latter song to be the song that "defined the lyrical agenda of much of hardcore music, and represented its break with punk". The band's most controversial album, Frankenchrist, brought with it the song "MTV Get Off the Air," which accused MTV of promoting poor quality music and sedating the public. The album also contained a controversial poster by Swiss surrealist artist H. R. Giger entitled Penis Landscape.

The Dead Kennedys toured widely during their career, starting in the late 1970s. They began playing at San Francisco's Mabuhay Gardens (their home base) and other Bay Area venues, later branching out to shows in southern Californian clubs (most notably the Whisky a Go Go), but eventually they moved to major clubs across the country, including CBGB in New York. Later, they played to larger audiences such as at the 1980 Bay Area Music Awards (where they played the notorious "Pull My Strings" for the only time), and headlined the 1983 Rock Against Reagan festival.

On May 7, 1994, punk rock fans who believed Biafra was a "sell out" attacked him at the 924 Gilman Street club in Berkeley, California. Biafra claims that he was attacked by a man nicknamed Cretin, who crashed into him while moshing. The crash injured Biafra's leg, causing an argument between the two men. During the argument, Cretin pushed Biafra to the floor and five or six friends of Cretin assaulted Biafra while he was down, yelling "Sellout rock star, kick him", and attempting to pull out his hair. Biafra was later hospitalized with serious injuries. The attack derailed Biafra's plans for both a Canadian spoken-word tour and an accompanying album, and the production of Pure Chewing Satisfaction was halted. However, Biafra returned to the Gilman club a few months after the incident to perform a spoken-word performance as an act of reconciliation with the club.

Biafra has been a prominent figure in the Californian punk scene and was one of the third-generation members of the San Francisco punk community. Many later hardcore bands have cited the Dead Kennedys as a major influence. Hardcore punk author Steven Blush describes Biafra as hardcore's "biggest star" who was a "powerful presence whose political insurgence and rabid fandom made him the father figure of a burgeoning subculture [and an] inspirational force [who] could also be a real prick ... Biafra was a visionary, incendiary [performer]."

After the Dead Kennedys disbanded, Biafra's new songs were recorded with other bands, and he released only spoken word albums as solo projects. These collaborations had less popularity than Biafra's earlier work. However, his song "That's Progress", originally recorded with D.O.A. for the album Last Scream of the Missing Neighbors, received considerable exposure when it appeared on the album Rock Against Bush, Vol. 1.

Obscenity prosecution
In April 1986, police officers raided Biafra's house in response to complaints by the Parents Music Resource Center (PMRC). In June 1986, L.A. deputy city attorney Michael Guarino, working under City Attorney James Hahn, brought Biafra to trial in Los Angeles for distributing "harmful material to minors" in the Dead Kennedys album Frankenchrist. However, the dispute was about neither the music nor the lyrics from the album, but rather the print of the H. R. Giger poster Landscape XX (Penis Landscape) included with the album.

Music author Reebee Garofalo argued that Biafra and Alternative Tentacles may have been targeted because the label was a "small, self-managed and self-supported company that could ill afford a protracted legal battle." Facing the possible sentence of a year in jail and a $2,000 fine, Biafra, Dirk Dirksen, and Suzanne Stefanac founded the No More Censorship Defense Fund, a benefit featuring several punk rock bands, to help pay for his legal fees, which neither he nor his record label could afford. The jury deadlocked 5 to 7 in favor of acquittal, prompting a mistrial; despite a motion to retry the case, the judge ordered all charges dropped. The Dead Kennedys disbanded during the trial, in December 1986, due to the mounting legal costs; in the wake of their disbandment, Biafra made a career of his spoken word performances.

Biafra has a cameo role in the 1988 film Tapeheads. He plays an FBI agent who arrests the two protagonists (played by Tim Robbins and John Cusack). While arresting them his character asks "Remember what we did to Jello Biafra?" lampooning the obscenity prosecution.

On March 25, 2005, Biafra appeared on the U.S. radio program This American Life, "Episode 285: Know Your Enemy", which featured a phone call between Jello Biafra and Michael Guarino, the prosecutor in the Frankenchrist trial.

Lawsuit and reunion activities
In October 1998, three former members of the Dead Kennedys sued Biafra for nonpayment of royalties. The other members of Dead Kennedys alleged that Biafra, in his capacity as the head of Alternative Tentacles records, discovered an accounting error amounting to some $75,000 in unpaid royalties over almost a decade. Rather than informing his bandmates of this mistake, the suit alleged, Biafra knowingly concealed the information until a whistleblower employee at the record label notified the band.

According to Biafra, the suit resulted from his refusal to allow one of the band's most well-known singles, "Holiday in Cambodia", to be used in a commercial for Levi's Dockers; Biafra opposes Levi's because of his belief that they use unfair business practices and sweatshop labor. Biafra maintained that he had never denied them royalties and that he himself had not even received royalties for re-releases of their albums or "posthumous" live albums which had been licensed to other labels by the Decay Music partnership. Decay Music denied this charge and have posted what they say are his cashed royalty checks, written to his legal name of Eric Boucher. Biafra also complained about the songwriting credits in new reissues and archival live albums of songs, alleging that he was the sole composer of songs that were wrongly credited to the entire band.

In May 2000, a jury found Biafra and Alternative Tentacles liable by not promptly informing his former bandmates of the accounting error and instead withholding the information during subsequent discussions and contractual negotiations. Biafra was ordered to pay $200,000, including $20,000 in punitive damages. After an appeal by Biafra's lawyers, in June 2003, the California Court of Appeals unanimously upheld all the conditions of the 2000 verdict against Biafra and Alternative Tentacles. Furthermore, the plaintiffs were awarded the rights to most of Dead Kennedys recorded works—which accounted for about half the sales for Alternative Tentacles. Now in control of the Dead Kennedys name, Biafra's former bandmates went on tour with a new lead vocalist.

Other bands
In the early 1980s, Biafra collaborated with musicians Christian Lunch and Adrian Borland (of The Sound) and Morgan Fisher (of Mott the Hoople) for the electropunk musical project The Witch Trials, releasing one self-titled EP in its lifetime.

In 1988, Biafra, with Al Jourgensen and Paul Barker of the band Ministry, and Jeff Ward, formed Lard. The band became yet another side project for Ministry, with Biafra providing vocals and lyrics. According to a March 2009 interview with Jourgensen, he and Biafra are working on a new Lard album, which is being recorded in Jourgensen's El Paso studio.  Jourgensen also claimed in 2021 that Biafra was in the works on a new Lard album. While working on the film Terminal City Ricochet in 1989, Biafra did a song for the film's soundtrack with D.O.A.. As a result, Biafra worked with D.O.A. on the album Last Scream of the Missing Neighbors. Biafra also worked with Nomeansno on the soundtrack, which led to their collaboration on the album The Sky Is Falling and I Want My Mommy the following year. Biafra also provided lyrics for the song "Biotech is Godzilla" for Sepultura's 1993 album Chaos A.D..

In 1999, Biafra and other members of the anti-globalization movement protested the WTO Meeting of 1999 in Seattle. Along with other prominent West Coast musicians, he formed the short-lived band No WTO Combo to help promote the movement's cause. The band was originally scheduled to play during the protest, but the performance was canceled due to riots. The band performed a short set the following night at the Showbox in downtown Seattle (outside the designated area), along with the hip-hop group Spearhead. No WTO Combo later released a CD of recordings from the concert, entitled Live from the Battle in Seattle.

As of late 2005, Biafra was performing with the band The Melvins under the name "Jello Biafra and the Melvins", though fans sometimes refer to them as "The Jelvins". Together they have released two albums, and worked on material for a third collaborative release, much of which was premiered live at two concerts at the Great American Music Hall in San Francisco during an event called Biafra Five-O, commemorating Biafra's 50th birthday, the 30th anniversary of the founding of the Dead Kennedys, and the beginning of legalized same-sex marriage in California. Biafra was also working with a band known as Jello Biafra and the Guantanamo School of Medicine, which included Ralph Spight of Victims Family on guitar and Billy Gould of Faith No More on bass. This group debuted during Biafra Five-O.

In 2011, Biafra appeared in a singular concert event with an all-star cast of Southern musicians including members from Cowboy Mouth, Dash Rip Rock, Mojo Nixon, and Down entitled, "Jello Biafra and the New Orleans Raunch & Soul All Stars" who performed an array of classic Soul covers to a packed house at the 12-Bar in New Orleans, Louisiana. He would later reunite with many of the same musicians during the Carnival season 2014 to revisit many of these classics in Siberia, New Orleans. A live album from the 2011 performance, Walk on Jindal's Splinters, and a companion single, Fannie May/Just a Little Bit, were released in 2015.

Alternative Tentacles
In June 1979, Biafra co-founded the record label Alternative Tentacles, with which the Dead Kennedys released their first single, "California über alles". The label was created to allow the band to release albums without having to deal with pressure from major labels to change their music, although the major labels were not willing to sign the band due to their songs being deemed too controversial. After dealing with Cherry Red in the UK and IRS Records in the US for their first album Fresh Fruit for Rotting Vegetables, the band released all later albums, and later pressings of Fresh Fruit on Alternative Tentacles. The exception was live albums released after the band's break-up, which the other band members compiled from recordings in the band partnership's vaults without Biafra's input or endorsement.. Biafra has been the owner of the company since its founding, though he does not receive a salary for his position; Biafra has referred to his position in the company as "absentee thoughtlord".

Biafra is an collector of unusual vinyl records of all kinds, from 1950s and 1960s ethno-pop recordings by the likes of Les Baxter and Esquivel to vanity pressings that have circulated regionally, to German crooner Heino (for whom he would later participate in the documentary Heino: Made In Germany); he cites his always growing collection as one of his biggest musical influences. In 1993 he gave an interview to RE/Search Publications for their second Incredibly Strange Music book focusing primarily on these records, and later participated in a two-part episode of Fuse TV's program Crate Diggers on the same subject. His interest in such recordings, often categorized as outsider music, led to his discovery of the prolific (and schizophrenic) singer/songwriter/artist Wesley Willis, whom he signed to Alternative Tentacles in 1994, preceding Willis' major label deal with American Recordings. His collection grew so large that on October 1, 2005, Biafra donated a portion of his collection to an annual yard sale co-promoted by Alternative Tentacles and held at their warehouse in Emeryville, California.

In 2006, along with Alternative Tentacles employee and The Frisk lead singer Jesse Luscious, Biafra began co-hosting The Alternative Tentacles Batcast, a downloadable podcast hosted by alternativetentacles.com. The show primarily focuses on interviews with artists and bands that are currently signed to the Alternative Tentacles label, although there are also occasional episodes where Biafra devoted the show to answering fan questions.

Spoken word

Biafra became a spoken word artist in January 1986 with a performance at University of California, Los Angeles. In his performance, he combined humor with his political beliefs, much in the same way that he did with the lyrics to his songs. Despite his continued spoken word performances, he did not begin recording spoken word albums until after the disbanding of the Dead Kennedys.

His ninth spoken word album, In the Grip of Official Treason, was released in October 2006.

Biafra was also featured in the British band Pitchshifter's song As Seen on TV reciting the words of dystopian futuristic radio advertisements.

Politics

Biafra has resisted identifying with any particular ideology, saying, "I don't label myself strictly an anarchist or a socialist or let alone a libertarian or something like that," In a 2012 interview, Biafra said "I'm very pro-tax as long as it goes for the right things. I don't mind paying more money as long as it's going to provide shelter for people sleeping in the street or getting the schools fixed back up, getting the infrastructure up to the standards of other countries, including a high-speed rail system. I'm totally down with that." Music critic Anthony Fantano credits Biafra as his "political idol".

Mayoral campaign

In the autumn of 1979, Biafra ran for mayor of San Francisco, using the Jell-O ad campaign catchphrase, "There's always room for Jello", as his campaign slogan. Having entered the race before creating a campaign platform, Biafra later wrote his platform on a napkin while attending a Pere Ubu concert where Dead Kennedys drummer Ted told Biafra, "Biafra, you have such a big mouth that you should run for Mayor." As he campaigned, Biafra wore campaign T-shirts from his opponent Quentin Kopp's previous campaign and at one point vacuumed leaves off the front lawn of another opponent, Dianne Feinstein, to mock her publicity stunt of sweeping streets in downtown San Francisco for a few hours. He also made a whistlestop campaign tour along the BART line. Supporters committed equally odd actions; two well-known signs held by supporters said "If he doesn't win I'll kill myself" and "What if he does win?"

At the time, in San Francisco, any individual could legally run for mayor if a petition was signed by 1500 people or if $1500 was paid. Biafra paid $900 and got signatures over time and eventually became a legal candidate, meaning he received statements put in voters' pamphlets and equal news coverage.

His platform included unconventional points such as forcing businessmen to wear clown suits within city limits, erecting statues of Dan White, who assassinated Mayor George Moscone and City Supervisor Harvey Milk in 1978, around the city and allowing the parks department to sell eggs and tomatoes with which people could pelt the statues, hiring workers who had lost their jobs due to a tax initiative to panhandle in wealthy neighborhoods (including Feinstein's), and a citywide ban on cars. Biafra has expressed irritation that these parts of his platform attained such notoriety, preferring instead to be remembered for serious proposals such as legalizing squatting in vacant, tax-delinquent buildings and requiring police officers to run for election by the people of the neighborhoods they patrol.

He finished third out of a field of ten, receiving 3.79 percent of the vote (6,591 votes); the election ended in a runoff that did not involve him (Feinstein was declared the winner).

Presidential campaign

In 2000, the New York State Green Party drafted Biafra as a candidate for the Green Party presidential nomination, and a few supporters were elected to the party's nominating convention in Denver, Colorado. Biafra chose death row inmate Mumia Abu-Jamal as his running mate. The party overwhelmingly chose Ralph Nader as the presidential candidate with 295 of the 319 delegate votes. Biafra received 10 votes.

Biafra, along with a camera crew (dubbed by Biafra as "The Camcorder Truth Jihad"), later reported for the Independent Media Center at the Republican and Democratic conventions.

Post-2000
After losing the 2000 nomination, Biafra became highly active in Nader's presidential campaign, as well as in 2004 and 2008. During the 2008 campaign Jello played at rallies and answered questions for journalists in support of Nader. When gay rights activists accused Nader of costing Al Gore the 2000 election, Biafra reminded them that Tipper Gore's Parents Music Resource Center wanted warning stickers on albums with content referencing homosexuality.

After Barack Obama won the general election, Biafra wrote an open letter making suggestions on how to run his term as president. Biafra criticized Obama during his term, stating that "Obama even won the award for best advertising campaign of 2008." Biafra dubbed Obama "Barackstar O'Bummer". Biafra refused to support Obama in 2012. Biafra has stated that he feels that Obama continued many of George W. Bush's policies, summarizing Obama's policies as containing "worse and worse laws against human rights and more and more illegal unconstitutional spying."

On September 18, 2015, it was announced that Biafra would be supporting Bernie Sanders in his campaign for the 2016 presidential election. He has strongly criticized the political position of Donald Trump, saying "how can people be so fucking stupid" on hearing the election result. He also criticized Trump's cabinet picks, saying of then-Secretary of Energy Rick Perry, "The last person we want with their finger on the nuclear button is somebody connected to this extreme Christianist doomsday cult."

On February 28, 2020, Jello announced that he would be supporting both Elizabeth Warren and Bernie Sanders in the 2020 presidential election. "I personally like Warren slightly better than Bernie because: 1) She’s done her homework. Bernie too, but not to quite the same depth or degree. 2) Think about it — who really has a better chance of actually beating Trump, and helping flip Congress and state legislatures? It’s Elizabeth Warren, hands down." He went on to say that he considered Joe Biden and Mike Bloomberg "almost as bad as Trump".

On April 12, 2020, Biafra expressed disappointment that Sanders had suspended his campaign for the 2020 Democratic nomination.

Boycott of Israel 
In mid-2011 Jello Biafra and his band were scheduled to play at the Barby Club in Tel Aviv. They came under pressure by the pro-Palestinian Boycott, Divestment and Sanctions (BDS) campaign, and finally decided to cancel the concert – after a debate which according to Biafra "deeply tore at the fabric of our band ... This whole controversy has been one of the most intense situations of my life – and I thrive on intense situations".

Biafra then decided to travel to Israel and the Palestinian Occupied Territories, at his own expense, and talk with Israeli and Palestinian activists as well as with fans disappointed at his cancellation. In the article stating his conclusions he wrote:
"I will not perform in Israel unless it is a pro-human rights, anti-occupation event, that does not violate the spirit of the boycott. Each musician, artist, etc. must decide this for themselves. I am staying away for now, but am also really creeped out by the attitudes of some of the hardliners and hope someday to find a way to contribute something positive here. I will not march or sign on with anyone who runs around calling people Zionazis and is more interested in making threats than making friends."

Personal life
Biafra married Theresa Soder, a.k.a. Ninotchka, lead singer of San Francisco-area punk band the Situations, on October 31, 1981. The wedding was conducted by Flipper vocalist/bassist Bruce Loose, who became a Universal Life Church minister specifically to conduct the ceremony, which took place in a graveyard. The wedding reception, which members of Flipper, Black Flag, and D.O.A. attended, was held at director Joe Rees' Target Video studios. 

The marriage ended in 1986. Biafra generally does not discuss his private life. He lives in San Francisco, California.

Selected discography
For a more complete list, see the Jello Biafra discography.

Dead Kennedys
 1980 – Fresh Fruit for Rotting Vegetables
 1981 – In God We Trust, Inc.
 1982 – Plastic Surgery Disasters
 1985 – Frankenchrist
 1986 – Bedtime for Democracy
 1987 – Give Me Convenience or Give Me Death

Spoken word
 1987 – No More Cocoons
 1989 – High Priest of Harmful Matter: Tales From the Trial
 1991 – I Blow Minds for a Living
 1994 – Beyond the Valley of the Gift Police
 1998 – If Evolution Is Outlawed, Only Outlaws Will Evolve
 2000 – Become the Media
 2002 – The Big Ka-Boom, Pt. 1
 2002 – Machine Gun in the Clown's Hand
 2006 – In the Grip of Official Treason

Lard
 1989 – The Power of Lard
 1990 – The Last Temptation of Reid
 1997 – Pure Chewing Satisfaction
 2000 – 70's Rock Must Die

Jello Biafra and the Guantanamo School of Medicine
 2009 – The Audacity of Hype
 2011 – Enhanced Methods of Questioning
 2012 – SHOCK-U-PY
 2013 – White People and the Damage Done
 2020 – Tea Party Revenge Porn

Collaborations

Filmography
 1977 – This Is America, Pt. 2
 1981 – Urgh! A Music War
 1983 – Anarchism in America
 1986 – Lovedolls Superstar, directed by Dave Markey
 1987 – Household Affairs, directed & filmed by Allen Ginsberg
 1988 – Tapeheads, directed by Bill Fishman
 1990 – Terminal City Ricochet
 1991 – Highway 61, directed by Bruce McDonald
 1994 – Skulhedface, directed by Melanie Mandl
 1997 – Mary Jane's Not a Virgin Anymore, directed by Sarah Jacobson
 1999 – The Widower
 1999 – Virtue
 2001 – Plaster Caster
 2002 – Bikini Bandits, directed by Steve and Peter Grasse
 2004 – Death and Texas
 2004 – Punk: Attitude
 2005 – We Jam Econo: The Story of the Minutemen
 2006 – Punk's Not Dead, directed by Susan Dynner
 2006 – Whose War?, directed by Donald Farmer
 2007 – American Drug War: The Last White Hope, directed by Kevin Booth
 2008 – Nerdcore Rising, directed by Negin Farsad
 2009 – Open Your Mouth and Say Mr. Chi Pig, directed by Sean Patrick Shaul
 2010 – A Man Within, directed by Yony Leyser
 2011 – I Love You ... I Am the Porn Queen, short film directed by Ani Kyd
 2014 – Heino: Made in Germany, directed by Oliver Schwabe 
 2014 – Portlandia, season 4, episode 4 – "Pull-Out King"
 2018 – Bathtubs Over Broadway, directed by Dava Whisenant (as himself)
 2018 – Boiled Angels: The Trial of Mike Diana, directed by Frank Henenlotter (narrator)
 2019 – The Last Black Man in San Francisco, directed by Joe Talbot

Notes

References

External links

Jello Biafra on Alternative Tentacles

1958 births
Living people
20th-century American politicians
Candidates in the 2000 United States presidential election
Alternative Tentacles
Alternative Tentacles artists
American anti–Iraq War activists
American anti-war activists
American human rights activists
American male film actors
American people of Jewish descent
American punk rock singers
American satirists
American male singer-songwriters
American spoken word artists
Anti-consumerists
Anti-corporate activists
Anti-globalization activists
Boulder High School alumni
California Greens
Dead Kennedys members
Finance fraud
Green Party of the United States politicians
Hardcore punk musicians
Jello Biafra and the Guantanamo School of Medicine members
Lard (band) members
Male actors from Boulder, Colorado
Musicians from Boulder, Colorado
Pigface members
Teenage Time Killers members
Singer-songwriters from Colorado